The Sana Konung is the Royal Palace of the rulers of Manipur, from the annexation of the Kangla by the British Forces in the Modern Manipur to the present day.

In recent years, the ruling titular monarch of Manipur is facing struggles against the "Government of Manipur" regarding the conversion of the historical building from the Royal residence into a public museum.

Sources 

 https://www.thenortheasttoday.com/amp/story/current-affairs/states/manipur/manipur-govt-to-build-guesthouse-to-accommodate-tribal-chiefs-on-their-visit-to-imphal
 https://www.thesangaiexpress.com/Encyc/2020/6/17/RNCM-and-others-visit-Sana-Konung-offer-blessing-to-titular-king-.html

References 

Buildings and structures in Manipur
Pages with unreviewed translations